The Collurania Observatory, also Teramo Observatory, (is an astronomical observatory located in Teramo, in Abruzzo region of central Italy. It was founded by Vincenzo Cerulli in 1890, who was later honoured by having it bear his name. The observatory is owned and operated by the National Institute for Astrophysics (INAF). It has the IAU code 037.

See also
 List of astronomical observatories

References

External links 
 Observatory home page

Collurania-Teramo